John Fawcett the younger (1825?–1857), was an English organist.

Fawcett was the third son of John Fawcett. Fawcett studied music under his father. He was organist of St John the Evangelist's Church, Farnworth from 1825 till 1842, and afterwards (until his death) of Bolton parish church, a post which had previously been held by an elder brother, and which was taken by a sister for a year in the interval of Fawcett's visit to London. Here he entered the Royal Academy of Music on 5 December 1845, to study under Sterndale Bennett, and became organist at Earl Howe's Curzon Street church.

On his return to Bolton, Fawcett resumed his duties as organist, teacher, and (1849) honorary conductor of the Bolton Harmonic Society. He obtained the degree of Mus. Bac. at Oxford University on 3 November 1852. His exercise, a sacred cantata, 'Supplication and Thanksgiving,’ was performed at the Music School, the composer conducting, and was published by subscription in 1856. This well-written cantata is the most important of Fawcett's compositions. He died in Manchester on 1 July 1857.

References

1825 births
1857 deaths
English classical organists
British male organists
19th-century classical musicians
People from Farnworth
19th-century conductors (music)
English conductors (music)
British male conductors (music)
19th-century English educators
Alumni of Magdalen Hall, Oxford
19th-century English musicians
Male classical organists
19th-century organists